
Gmina Parchowo is a rural gmina (administrative district) in Bytów County, Pomeranian Voivodeship, in northern Poland.

Neighbouring gminas
Gmina Parchowo is bordered by the gminas of Bytów, Czarna Dąbrówka, Lipusz, Sierakowice, Studzienice and Sulęczyno.

References
 Polish official population figures 2006

Kashubia
Parchowo
Bytów County
Bilingual communes in Poland